I Love It may refer to:

 I Love It (album), by Craig Morgan, 2003
 "I Love It" (Hilltop Hoods song), featuring Sia, 2011
 "I Love It" (Kanye West and Lil Pump song), featuring Adele Givens, 2018
 "I Love It" (Kylie Minogue song), 2020
 "I Love It" (Icona Pop song), featuring Charli XCX, 2012
 "I Love It" (Sneaky Sound System song), 2006

See also
 "I Don't Like It, I Love It", a 2015 song by Flo Rida featuring Robin Thicke and Verdine White
 "I Like It, I Love It", a 1995 song by Tim McGraw
 I, Lovett, a 1989/1993 British television sitcom
 I Like It (disambiguation)
 I Luv It (disambiguation)
 Love It (disambiguation)